Sidney Foster "Sid" McGinnis (born October 6, 1949) is an American musician and guitarist, best known for his work on the CBS television show Late Show with David Letterman, as part of the CBS Orchestra.

The Pittsburgh-born guitarist made his first appearance in the Late Night with David Letterman band in 1984 as a guest guitarist, and continued as a permanent guitarist with Letterman's television shows until Letterman's retirement.

McGinnis has also toured and/or recorded with numerous artists including  Warren Zevon, Ashford and Simpson, Barry Manilow, Peter Gabriel Peter Gabriel, Carly Simon, Dire Straits, Robert Fripp Exposure, The Sisters Of Mercy, Cool It Reba, Laurie Anderson, David Lee Roth, Bob Dylan, David Bowie, Leonard Cohen Various Positions, Paul Simon, Simon & Garfunkel and others.

Discography 
 1975 : Barry Manilow by Barry Manilow
 1978 : Peter Gabriel II by Peter Gabriel 
 1979 : Exposure by Robert Fripp 
 1979 : Entre Nous by Diane Tell
 1979 : Bottom Line by John Mayall
 1980 : Making Movies by Dire Straits
 1980 : Sacred Songs by Daryl Hall
 1980 : Red Cab To Manhattan by Stephen Bishop
 1980 : Rock 'N' Rye by Mike Cross 
 1980 : Come Upstairs by Carly Simon
 1980 : Suzanne Fellini by Suzanne Fellini
 1981 : Street Angel by Ron Dante
 1985 : Lost In The Stars The Music Of Kurt Weill by Various Artists
 1985 : Crazy From The Heat by David Lee Roth
 1987 : Never Let Me Down  by David Bowie
 1989 : Coast To Coast by Paul Shaffer
 1990 : On The Air by Peter Gabriel
 1992 : Revisited by Peter Gabriel
 2002 : Anthology by Carly Simon
 2003 : Then And Now by Peter Gabriel
 2007 : The Essential Paul Simon by Paul Simon

References

External links
Bio of Sid McGinnis at CBS.com

1949 births
Living people
Musicians from Pittsburgh
American rock guitarists
American male guitarists
Paul Shaffer and the World's Most Dangerous Band members
Pedal steel guitarists
Guitarists from Pennsylvania
20th-century American guitarists